Guo Dongming (born 30 April 1959) is a Chinese engineer, an academician of the Chinese Academy of Engineering, and currently president of Dalian University of Technology.

He was an alternate member of the 19th Central Committee of the Chinese Communist Party.

Biography
Guo was born in Wen County, Henan, on 30 April 1959. He earned a bachelor's degree in 1982, a master's degree in 1984, and a doctor's degree in 1992, all from Dalian University of Technology and all in machine manufacturing.

Guo worked at Dalian University of Technology after graduating in 1984. He moved up the ranks to become director of the Department of Mechanical Engineering in July 1996 and dean of the School of Mechanical Engineering in September 1999. In 1995, he was hired as a visiting professor at Chuo University in Japan. In 1998, he became a visiting scholar at the Oregon Graduate Institute of Science and Technology for three months. From May 2000 to May 2001, he was a professor at the  University of Melbourne. He was promoted to vice president of Dalian University of Technology in 2002 and executive vice president in 2011. On 25 February 2014, he was promoted again to become president of the university, a position at vice-ministerial level.

Honours and awards
 2005 State Technological Invention Award (Second Class) for the development and industrial application of highly active hydrorefining catalyst for clean fuel production
 2008 State Technological Invention Award (First Class) for orecision manufacturing technology and equipment for hard and brittle materials with complex curved surfaces
 2011 Member of the Chinese Academy of Engineering (CAE)
 2019 State Science and Technology Progress Award (First Class)

References

1959 births
Living people
People from Wen County, Henan
Engineers from Henan
Dalian University of Technology alumni
Academic staff of Dalian University of Technology
Presidents of Dalian University of Technology
Members of the Chinese Academy of Engineering
People's Republic of China politicians from Henan
Chinese Communist Party politicians from Henan
Alternate members of the 19th Central Committee of the Chinese Communist Party